The EP-101 was the first ever electronic miniprinter for printing figures and symbols and was launched by Shinshu Seiki Co., a subsidiary of Suwa Seikosha Co., Ltd, in September 1968. The drum printer wasn't very big, being only 164 millimetres in width, 102 millimetres in height, 135 millimetres in depth and weighed 2.5 kilograms. It was created out of development work that Shinshu Seiki did for the Seiko Group when they became the official time-keepers for the 1964 Tokyo Olympic games and needed a machine that could print out times they gathered from their time-pieces.

In 1975, Shinshu Seiki began branding printers as EPSON. The brand name comes from the next generation version of this printer – son of EP, or EP-son. Shinshu Seiki renamed Epson Corporation in 1982 and was merged with Suwa Seikosha to form Seiko Epson Corporation in 1985.

External links 
 The world's first smallest digital printer – and progenitor of Epson 

Computer printers
Epson